Fox 25 can refer to one of the following television stations in the United States that broadcast on channel 25 and carry the Fox affiliation:

 KOKH-TV, Oklahoma City, Oklahoma
 WFXT, Boston, Massachusetts
 WLAX, La Crosse, Wisconsin
 WXXV-TV, Gulfport, Mississippi

Former
 WOHL-CD, Lima, Ohio (during 1995–2009)